Al-Nuqayb was a Palestinian Arab village in the Tiberias Subdistrict. It was depopulated during the 1948 Arab-Israeli War on May 15, 1948. It was located 10 km east across the lake from Tiberias. bordering the Wadi al-Muzaffar and Wadi Samakh. al-Nuqayb was named after the Bedouin tribe of 'Arab al-Nuqayb.

Location
The village was located on the eastern shore of Lake Tiberias, with the fortress Qal'at al-Hisn located just to the east.

History
In the 1880s most of the village land was purchased by the Bahá'u'lláh, while the villagers continued to farm as tenant farmers.

British Mandate era
In the 1920s, the land the Bahá'u'lláh had purchased was sold to the JNF.
At the time of the 1922 census of Palestine  conducted by the British Mandate authorities, Nuqhaib  had a population of 103 Muslims, increasing in the 1931 census to 287 Muslims, in  60 houses. 

The Kibbutz of Ein Gev was established in 1937, 1,5 km south of the village site.

In   1944/1945, the village had a population of 320 Muslims, with a total of 967 dunams of land.  Of this,  131 dunams  were irrigated or used for plantations,   797 were used for  cereals,  while 30 dunams were classified as built-up (urban) land.

1948, aftermath
After the 1948 Palestine war, according to the armistice agreements of 1949 Between Israel and Syria, it was determined that a string of villages, including Nuqeib, Al-Hamma,   Al-Samra in the Tiberias Subdistrict and Kirad al-Baqqara and Kirad al-Ghannama further north in the Safad Subdistrict, would be included the demilitarized zone (DMZ) between Israel and Syria. The villagers and their property were formally protected by Article V of the Israeli-Syrian agreement of 20 July that year. However,  Israel thought the villagers could pose a security threat, and Israeli settlers and settlement agencies coveted the land. Israel therefore wanted the Palestinian inhabitants, a total of 2,200 villagers, moved to Syria. 
Most of the villagers were eventually moved to Syria, while some were "transferred" to Sha'ab.

In 1992 the village site was described: "The site is fenced in and covered with thorny grass and various kinds of trees, such as Christ's-thorn trees. Piles of stones and the remains of walls can be seen. Part of the surrounding land is cultivated by the nearby settlement, and the remainder is used as a grazing area by Israelis."

References

Bibliography

External links
Welcome To al-Nuqayb
al-Nuqayb, Zochrot
Al-Nuqayb,  from the Khalil Sakakini Cultural Center

   

Arab villages depopulated during the 1948 Arab–Israeli War
District of Tiberias